The 1991 Caribbean Cup (known as the Shell Caribbean Cup for sponsorship reasons) was the third edition of the Caribbean Cup, the football championship of the Caribbean, one of the CONCACAF zones. The final round of the competition was held from the 24 May to 2 June and saw six teams qualifying through to the final round where they joined defending champions Trinidad and Tobago and hosts Jamaica.

The eight teams (seven after Cuba withdrew from the competition) were separated into two groups of four with the top two teams from each group qualifying through to the knockout stage where the semi-finals winners qualifying through to the Gold Cup which was held four weeks after the Caribbean tournament. In the final, Jamaica defeated Trinidad and Tobago 2-0 with goals from Paul Davis and Winston Anglin securing Jamaica's first title as they qualified to the Gold Cup with Trinidad and Tobago. In the third place play-off, Saint Lucia defeated Guyana 4-1.

Qualifying tournament
final stage automatically.

Group 1
Played in San Juan, Puerto Rico

Group 2
played in Martinique

Group 3
 received a bye to the Final Stage, apparently because of regional strength.

Group 4
played in Saint Kitts and Nevis

Group 5
played in Georgetown, Guyana

Group 6
played in Castries, Saint Lucia

Final tournament

First round
played in Kingston, Jamaica

Group A
 withdrew

Group B

Semi-finals

Third-place match

Final

References

External links
Tournament details on RSSSF website

Caribbean Cup
Caribbean Cup
International association football competitions hosted by Jamaica
1990–91 in Jamaican football